The O'Sullivan Beach-Lonsdale Football Club, also known as the Lonsdale Lions, is an Australian rules football club that plays in the Adelaide Footy League.

Overview 
The club was formed as a merger of the Lonsdale Football Club and the O’Sullivan Beach Football Club at the end of the 2001 season. 
The club started in the Southern Football League competition in 2002 where they remained until 2017, fielding teams in Senior and some Junior grades.

References

External links
 
 Team profile on AFL National

Southern Football League (SA) Clubs
Australian rules football clubs in South Australia
2001 establishments in Australia
Australian rules football clubs established in 2001